Clostridium algidicarnis  is a psychrotrophic bacterium from the genus Clostridium which has been isolated from refrigerated pork.

References

 

Bacteria described in 1995
algidicarnis